The World (XXI)  is the 22nd trump or Major Arcana card in the tarot deck. It is the final card of the Major Arcana or tarot trump sequence (the first being "The Fool" (0)). It is associated with the 22nd and last letter of the Phoenician alphabet, "Tav", which is a cross.

Description 

In the traditional Tarot of Marseilles, as well as the later Rider–Waite tarot deck, a naked woman hovers or dances above the Earth holding a staff in each hand, surrounded by a wreath, being watched by the four living creatures (or hayyoth) of Jewish mythology: a man, a lion, an ox, and an eagle. This depiction parallels the tetramorph used in Christian art, where the four creatures are used as symbols of the four Evangelists. Some astrological sources explain these observers as representatives of the natural world or the kingdom of beasts. According to astrological tradition the Lion is Leo—a fire sign, the Bull or calf is Taurus—an earth sign, the Man is Aquarius—an air sign, and the Eagle is Scorpio—a water sign. These signs are the four fixed signs and represent the classical four elements.

In some decks the wreath is an ouroboros biting its own tail. In the Thoth Tarot designed by Aleister Crowley, this card is called "The Universe."

Interpretation
According to A.E. Waite's 1910 book The Pictorial Key to the Tarot, the World card carries several divinatory associations:

21.THE WORLD—Assured success, recompense, voyage, route, emigration, flight, change of place.  Reversed: Inertia, fixity, stagnation, permanence.

The World represents an ending to a cycle of life, a pause in life before the next big cycle beginning with the fool. The figure is male and female, above and below, suspended between the heavens and the earth. It is completeness. It is also said to represent cosmic consciousness; the potential of perfect union with the One Power of the universe. It tells us full happiness is to also give back to the world: sharing what we have learned or gained. As described in the book The New Mythic Tarot by Juliet Sharman-Burke and Liz Greene (p. 82), the image of the woman (Hermaphroditus in Greek Mythology) is to show wholeness unrelated to sexual identification but rather of combined male and female energy on an inner level, which integrates opposites traits that arise in the personality charged by both energies. Opposite qualities between male and female that create turmoil in our life are joined in this card, and the image of becoming whole is an ideal goal, not something that can be possessed rather than achieved.

According to Robert M. Place in his book The Tarot, the four beasts on the World card represent the fourfold structure of the physical world—which frames the sacred center of the world, a place where the divine can manifest. Sophia, meaning Prudence or Wisdom (the dancing woman in the center), is spirit or the sacred center, the fifth element. Prudence is the fourth of the Cardinal virtues in the tarot. The lady in the center is a symbol of the goal of mystical seekers.  In some older decks, this central figure is Christ, whereas in others it is Hermes. Whenever it comes up, this card represents what is truly desired.

In other media
In the manga JoJo's Bizarre Adventure: Stardust Crusaders, tarot cards are used to name the character's powers, named 'Stands'. The overarching antagonist of Stardust Crusaders, DIO, has a Stand named The World, named after The World card. This stand has the power to stop time whenever DIO commands it to, and he can move during frozen time. In Steel Ball Run, an alternate version of DIO, Diego Brando, later gains this Stand after being summoned by Funny Valentine.

In the film Cryptozoo, a tarot reading is done with the Waite-Smith Deck that reveals The World card as part of the protagonist's journey.

Tarot cards are common in the Persona video game series.  The female protagonist of Persona 3 Portable, Kotone Shiomi, wears pins in her hair spelling XXII, to symbolize The World.

References

Bibliography

External links 

World, The